The Red Synagogue of Jonava is a destroyed synagogue in Jonava.

History 

In 1941 80% of Jonava's population was Jewish and town had seven synagogues.

At present only two synagogues remain and both are not in use: Beit Medrash Hagadol Synagogue of Jonava and Jonava Synagogue of Merchants. The other synagogues were destroyed when Jonava was attacked by Nazi Germany.

Red Synagogue of Jonava was the biggest and main synagogue in Jonava. It was located in front of remaining Beit Midrash Hagadol synagogue has been destroyed.

See also
Lithuanian Jews

References

Sources
 Lithuanian Jewish community

Synagogues in Jonava
Synagogues destroyed by Nazi Germany